Exogenous (April 12, 1998 - November 2, 2001) was an American Thoroughbred racehorse and the winner of the 2001 Beldame Stakes.

Career
Bred and raced by Vernon Heath's Centaur Farms, Inc., Exogenous' made her racing debut on July 15, 2000 at Belmont Park where she came in fourth place. She did not win her first race until her fifth start on November 18, 2000. She then won two races at Belmont Park in early summer 2001, before she started competing in stakes and graded races.

Exogenous ran third in the June 30, 2001, Mother Goose Stakes and then placed second in both the 2001 Coaching Club American Oaks and the 2001 Alabama Stakes. The last two races of her career were both wins, coming in the September 8, 2001,  Gazelle Handicap and then the Beldame Stakes.

Scheduled to compete in the October 27, 2001 Breeders' Cup Distaff at Belmont Park, Exogenous suffered a skull fracture after she flipped onto her back while leaving the paddock before the start of the race. Initially it was thought she would heal and likely race again but her condition worsened during the week. When she could no longer stand up, the decision was made to humanely euthanize her.

Pedigree

References

1998 racehorse births
2001 racehorse deaths
American racehorses
Racehorses bred in Kentucky
Racehorses trained in the United States